Căldăraru is a commune in Argeș County, Romania.

Căldăraru may also refer to:

Căldăraru, a village in Cernica commune, Ilfov County, Romania
Căldăraru, a tributary of the Glavacioc in Teleorman County, Romania

See also
 Căldărușa (disambiguation)